Michael S. Rogers (born October 31, 1959) is a former United States Navy admiral who served as the second commander of the United States Cyber Command (USCYBERCOM). He concurrently served as the 17th director of the National Security Agency (NSA) and as chief of the Central Security Service (CSS) from April 3, 2014. Prior to that, Rogers served as the Commander of the Tenth Fleet and Commander of the United States Fleet Cyber Command. During his tenure, he helped transform and elevate U.S. Cyber Command into a unified combatant command. He relinquished command on May 4, 2018 to his successor, Paul M. Nakasone. He retired from active duty in the United States Navy on June 1, 2018.

Early life and education
Rogers was born on October 31, 1959 and is a native of Chicago, Illinois. He graduated from New Trier High School in 1977. He is a graduate of Auburn University (1981) and the Naval War College.

Career

1980s
Rogers received his commission through the Naval Reserve Officers Training Corps (NROTC) program and has served in the United States Navy since graduating from Auburn University in 1981. He started his career as a Surface Warfare Officer working in naval gunfire support operations off Grenada, Beirut, and maritime surveillance operations off El Salvador on board the USS Caron (DD-970). In 1986, he was selected for transfer from unrestricted line officer to restricted line officer and re-designation as a cryptology officer.

2000s
During the 2003 U.S. invasion of Iraq, Rogers joined the military's Joint Staff, which works for the Joint Chiefs of Staff, where he specialized in computer network attacks. From 2007 onward he served as director of intelligence for the military's Pacific Command. In 2009, he became director of intelligence for the Joint Chiefs of Staff, and was subsequently named commander of U.S. Fleet Cyber Command and commander of the U.S. 10th Fleet, with responsibility for all of the Navy's cyberwarfare efforts. As such, Rogers was the first restricted line officer to serve as a numbered fleet commander and the first Information Warfare Community (IWC) officer to achieve the rank of vice admiral.

2010s
In January 2014, the Obama Administration announced Rogers' nomination as director of the National Security Agency and the commander of the United States offensive cyberoperations unit in the Department of Defense. Rogers succeeded General Keith B. Alexander, who served as the NSA director for nine years, and became the first IWC officer to achieve the rank of admiral. Although the NSA directorship does not require Senate approval, Rogers had to be confirmed by the Senate to head United States Cyber Command, for which the Senate unanimously confirmed him.

In his first public remarks as NSA director, Rogers stated that he believed that NSA whistleblower Edward Snowden was "probably not" working for a foreign intelligence agency despite speculation to the contrary. Rogers added: "He clearly believes in what he's doing. I question that; I don't agree with it. I fundamentally disagree with what he did. I believe it was wrong; I believe it was illegal."

In January 2018, Rogers announced he would be retiring from the NSA in the spring.

In early 2019, Rogers became the Chairman of the Board of Advisors of Claroty, a cybersecurity firm.

2020s
In October 2022, Rogers joined the Council for Responsible Social Media project launched by Issue One to address the negative mental, civic, and public health impacts of social media in the United States co-chaired by former House Democratic Caucus Leader Dick Gephardt and former Massachusetts Lieutenant Governor Kerry Healey.

Military decorations

References

External links
 
 

|-

|-

|-

1959 births
Auburn University alumni
Living people
New Trier High School alumni
Military personnel from Chicago
Recipients of the Defense Superior Service Medal
Recipients of the Navy Distinguished Service Medal
United States Navy admirals
Directors of the National Security Agency
Recipients of the Meritorious Service Medal (United States)